Elections to Down District Council were held on 5 May 2011 on the same day as the other Northern Irish local government elections. The election used four district electoral areas to elect a total of 23 councillors.

Election results

Note: "Votes" are the first preference votes.

Districts summary

|- class="unsortable" align="centre"
!rowspan=2 align="left"|Ward
! % 
!Cllrs
! % 
!Cllrs
! %
!Cllrs
! %
!Cllrs
! % 
!Cllrs
! % 
!Cllrs
! % 
!Cllrs
!rowspan=2|TotalCllrs
|- class="unsortable" align="center"
!colspan=2 bgcolor="" | SDLP
!colspan=2 bgcolor="" | Sinn Féin
!colspan=2 bgcolor="" | DUP
!colspan=2 bgcolor="" | UUP
!colspan=2 bgcolor="" | Alliance
!colspan=2 bgcolor="" | Green
!colspan=2 bgcolor="white"| Others
|-
|align="left"|Ballynahinch
|bgcolor="#99FF66"|26.5
|bgcolor="#99FF66"|2
|20.4
|1
|26.0
|1
|14.3
|1
|3.6
|0
|3.0
|0
|6.2
|0
|5
|-
|align="left"|Downpatrick
|bgcolor="#99FF66"|57.4
|bgcolor="#99FF66"|4
|27.4
|2
|2.4
|0
|4.8
|0
|0.0
|0
|8.0
|0
|0.0
|0
|7
|-
|align="left"|Newcastle
|33.3
|2
|bgcolor="#008800"|36.3
|bgcolor="#008800"|2
|7.8
|0
|9.5
|1
|8.4
|1
|4.6
|0
|0.0
|0
|6
|-
|align="left"|Rowallane
|15.8
|1
|4.9
|0
|bgcolor="#D46A4C"|32.9
|bgcolor="#D46A4C"|2
|26.3
|1
|8.1
|0
|0.0
|0
|12.0
|1
|5
|- class="unsortable" class="sortbottom" style="background:#C9C9C9"
|align="left"| Total
|34.2
|9
|22.9
|5
|16.4
|3
|13.2
|3
|4.9
|1
|4.1
|1
|4.3
|1
|23
|-
|}

Districts results

Ballynahinch

2005: 2 x SDLP, 1 x DUP, 1 x Sinn Féin, 1 x UUP
2011: 2 x SDLP, 1 x DUP, 1 x Sinn Féin, 1 x UUP
2005-2011 Change: No change

Downpatrick

2005: 4 x SDLP, 2 x Sinn Féin, 1 x Green
2011: 2 x SDLP, 2 x Sinn Féin, 1 x Green
2005-2011 Change: No change

Newcastle

2005: 3 x SDLP, 2 x Sinn Féin, 1 x UUP
2011: 2 x SDLP, 2 x Sinn Féin, 1 x UUP, 1 x Alliance
2005-2011 Change: Alliance gain from SDLP

Rowallane

2005: 2 x DUP, 2 x UUP, 1 x SDLP
2011: 2 x DUP, 1 x UUP, 1 x SDLP, 1 x Independent
2005-2011 Change: Independent gain from UUP

References

Down District Council elections
Down